The women's field hockey tournament at the 2017 Southeast Asian Games was held from 21 to 28 August in Malaysia. In this tournament, 5 Southeast Asian teams played in the women's competition.

All matches were played at the National Hockey Stadium in Bukit Jalil.

Competition schedule
The following was the competition schedule for the women's field hockey competitions:

Participating nations
The following five teams participated for the competition.

  (INA)
  (MAS)
  (MYA)
  (SGP)
  (THA)

Match officials

Draw
There was no official draw since only 5 teams participating in this competition. All teams are automatically drawn to one group.

Results 
All times are Malaysia Standard Time (UTC+8).

Group stage

Bronze medal match

Gold medal match

See also
Men's tournament

References

External links
Official website

Women's tournament
2017 in women's field hockey
2017 Southeast Asian Games - Women's tournament
2017 in Malaysian women's sport